James Ijames is an American performer and playwright from Bessemer City, North Carolina born sometime in the early 1980s. He is currently based in Philadelphia, Pennsylvania. He received a B.A. in Drama from Morehouse College in Atlanta, Georgia, and received his MFA in Acting from Temple University in Philadelphia. He is an assistant professor of Theater at Villanova University

Plays 
 Youth
 History of Walking – Developed at Theatre Exile in Philadelphia, Pennsylvania
 Matter Out of Place – Developed at InterAct Theater Company and Available Light Theater in Columbus, Ohio
 Kill Move Paradise - Premiered at the National Black Theater in 2017
 White – Developed at the PlayPenn New Play Conference, World Premiered at Theater Horizon in Philadelphia, Pennsylvania
 Moon Man Walk – World Premiered at Orbiter 3 Playwrights Collective in 2015
 The Most Spectacularly Lamentable Trial of Miz Martha Washington – World Premiere at the Flashpoint Theater Company in Philadelphia, Pennsylvania
 The Threshing Floor
 Fat Ham - Film premiered from the Wilma Theater 2021

Awards and accolades 
 F. Otto Haas Award for Emerging Artist (2011) 
 Two Barrymores for Outstanding Supporting Actor in a Play for Superior Donuts and Angels in America 
 One Barrymore for Outstanding Direction of a Play for The Brothers Size 
 Terrence McNally New Play Award for White (2015)
 Pew Fellowship in the Arts for Playwriting (2015)
 Kesselring Honorable Mention Prize for Miz Martha
 Whiting Award for Drama (2017)
 Pulitzer Prize for Drama for Fat Ham (2022)

Critical reviews 
"Mr. Ijames's play has no sense of an ending, or of resolution. It takes place in a nightmare of history, in which events are repeated, fugue-like, into eternity. (In this sense, the early work of Suzan-Lori Parks comes to mind.)" – Ben Brantley New York Times in response to Kill Move Paradise.

"The ending adds a surreal twist by driving home Ijames' exploration of black women's exploitation by feminism, by contemporary culture and white women." – Jim Rutter Philadelphia Inquirer in response to White

"In short, there's a lot of talk about "new work" in theater and opera in this town, but Moon Man Walk provides the kind of artistic quality that the Philadelphia arts community needs to not only achieve with new works but invest in." – Bryan Buttler for Philadelphia Magazine in response to Moon Man Walk.

Orbiter 3 
James Ijames is a founding member of Orbiter 3, Philadelphia's first playwright producing organization which strives to create inclusive local art to further the Philadelphia theatre scene. Their reported goal is to produce six plays over the next three years. Orbiter 3 has been host to developments and productions of Ijames' own work.

References 

Year of birth missing (living people)
Living people
American male dramatists and playwrights
Temple University alumni
Morehouse College alumni
People from Bessemer City, North Carolina
African-American dramatists and playwrights